This is a progressive list of association footballers who have held or co-held the record for internationals goals scored for the Australia national soccer team, beginning with William Maunder, who scored in the 3–1 defeat by New Zealand in Australia's first international game.

The record is held by Tim Cahill, with 50 goals, a record he set after scoring twice against Syria in 2017. Cahill moved beyond Damian Mori's 29 international goals when he scored twice against Ecuador in September 2014. Mori had taken the position of Australia's leading goalscorer in April 2001, when his four goals saw him overtakes Attila Abonyi.

Criteria
This list contains records from only "A" internationals, as recognised by Football Federation Australia.

Australia record

See also
 Australia national soccer team records and statistics
 List of international goals scored by Tim Cahill

References

General
 
 
 

Specific

Australia national soccer team records and statistics
Australia goals record
Association football player non-biographical articles